The 2012–13 Delaware Fightin' Blue Hens men's basketball team represented the University of Delaware during the 2012–13 NCAA Division I men's basketball season. The Fightin' Blue Hens, led by seventh year head coach Monté Ross, played their home games at the Bob Carpenter Center and were members of the Colonial Athletic Association. They finished the season 19–14, 13–5 in CAA play to finish in a tie for second place. They lost in the semifinals of the CAA tournament to James Madison.

Roster

Schedule

|-
!colspan=9| Regular season

|-
!colspan=9| 2013 CAA men's basketball tournament

References

Delaware Fightin' Blue Hens men's basketball seasons
Delaware
Fight
Fight